Erich Pennekamp (13 November 1929 – 1 March 2013) was a German water polo player. He competed in the men's tournament at the 1956 Summer Olympics.

References

1929 births
2013 deaths
German male water polo players
Olympic water polo players of the United Team of Germany
Water polo players at the 1956 Summer Olympics
Place of birth missing